The 1997 UEFA Women's Championship, also referred to as Women's Euro 1997 was a football tournament held in 1997 in Norway and Sweden. The UEFA Women's Championship is a regular tournament involving European national teams from countries affiliated to UEFA, the European governing body, who have qualified for the competition. The competition aims to determine which national women's team is the best in Europe.

Germany won the competition for the second time in a row and 4th overall (counting with West Germany's victory in the former European Competition for Representative Women's Teams).

Format
1997 saw a change in the tournament format as an eight-team final stage was introduced. Eight teams participated, qualifying from a total of 33 entrants. Those eight teams were divided in two groups of four. The winner and 2nd placed of the group would advance to the semi-finals and the winners would play the final.

Group A

Group B

Qualification

Squads
For a list of all squads that played in the final tournament, see UEFA Women's Euro 1997 squads

Results

Group A

Group B

Knockout stage

Semifinals

Final

Awards

Goalscorers
4 goals

 Carolina Morace
 Marianne Pettersen
 Angélique Roujas

3 goals
 Ángeles Parejo

2 goals
 Birgit Prinz

1 goal

 Lene Terp
 Merete Pedersen
 Maren Meinert
 Monika Meyer
 Sandra Minnert
 Bettina Wiegmann
 Antonella Carta
 Silvia Fiorini
 Patrizia Panico
 Heidi Støre
 Malin Andersson
 Kristin Jonsson
 Hanna Ljungberg
 Anna Pohjanen
 Victoria Sandell Svensson
 Irina Grigorieva
 Larisa Savina

Own goal
 Cécile Locatelli (playing against Sweden)

See also
UEFA Women's Championship
UEFA
Women's association football

References

External links
Women's Euro 1997 Results – UEFA Official Page
Results at RSSSF
Italy Women International Results at RSSSF
SVT's open archive 

 
Women
1997
1997
1997
UEFA
1997 in Swedish women's football
1997 in Norwegian women's football
1996–97 in German women's football
1996–97 in Italian women's football
1996–97 in French women's football
1997 in Russian football
1996–97 in Spanish women's football
1996–97 in Danish women's football
June 1997 sports events in Europe
July 1997 sports events in Europe
Sports competitions in Karlstad
Sports competitions in Karlskoga
Lillestrøm
Sport in Moss, Norway
International sports competitions in Oslo
1990s in Oslo